N622 may refer to:

 N622 highway, a road in the Philippines
 N-622 road (Álava), a road in Spain